Émilie Loit and Barbora Strýcová were the defending champions, but neither chose to compete that year.

Yan Zi and Zheng Jie won the title over Ashley Harkleroad and Bethanie Mattek in the final.

Seeds

  Yan Zi /  Zheng Jie (champions) 
  Ashley Harkleroad /  Bethanie Mattek (finals, runners-up)
  Anastasia Rodionova /  Neha Uberoi (quarterfinals)
  Maureen Drake /  Milagros Sequera (semifinals)

Results

Draw

References
 Results

2006 WTA Tour
Morocco Open
2006 in Moroccan tennis